Baba Balak Nath is a Hindu deity, who is worshiped with great reverence in the North-Indian state of Himachal Pradesh and Punjab.  His main place of worship is known as Deotsidh, this temple is situated in the high peak of the hill of Chakmoh village.

In popular culture
Notable Indian films on the deity include: Shiv Bhakat Baba Balak Nath (1972) by Avatar, Jai Baba Balak Nath (1981) by Satish Bhakri.

References

Sidh Baba Balak Nath